The Human Genome Organisation (HUGO) is a non-profit organization founded in 1988. HUGO represents an international coordinating scientific body in response to initiatives such as the Human Genome Project. HUGO has four active committees, including the HUGO Gene Nomenclature Committee (HGNC), and the HUGO Committee on Ethics, Law and Society (CELS).

History
HUGO was established at the first meeting on genome mapping and sequencing at Cold Spring Harbor in 1988. The idea of starting the organization stemmed from South African biologist Sydney Brenner, who is best known for his significant contributions to work on the genetic code and other areas of molecular biology, as well as winning the 2002 Nobel Prize in Physiology or Medicine.

A Founding Council was elected at the meeting with a total of 42 scientists from 17 different countries, with Victor A. McKusick serving as founding President. In 2016, HUGO was located at the EWHA Womans University in Seoul, South Korea. In 2020, the HUGO headquarters moved to Farmington, Connecticut, USA.

HUGO has convened a Human Genome Meeting (HGM) every year since 1996.

In partnership with geneticist Yuan-Tsong Chen and Alice Der-Shan Chen, founders of the Chen Foundation, HUGO presents the Chen Award to those with research accomplishments in human genetics and genomics in Asia Pacific.

In 2020, HUGO merged with the Human Genomic Variation Society (HGVS) and Human Variome Project (HVP).

Presidents 
Charles Lee (South Korea, USA) – 2017 – Present

Stylianos Antonarakis (Switzerland) – 2012 to 2017

Edison Liu (Singapore) – 2007 to 2012

Leena Peltonen (Finland) – 2005 to 2007

Yoshiyuki Sakaki (Japan) – 2002 to 2005

Lap‐Chee Tsui (Canada) – 2000 to 2002

Gert‐Jan van Ommen (Netherlands) – 1998 to 1999

Grant Sutherland (Australia) -1996 to 1997

Thomas Caskey (USA) – 1993 to 1995

Walter Bodmer (UK) – 1991 to 1993

Victor McKusick (USA), Founding President – 1988 to 1991

HUGO Committee on Ethics, Law and Society 
HUGO's Committee on Ethics, Law and Society (CELS) is an interdisciplinary academic working group that is a uniquely positioned to analyse bioethical matters in genomics at a conceptual level and with an international perspective. To this end, CELS mission is to explore and inform professional discourse on the ethical aspects of genetics and genomics, normally though scholarly engagement, thought-provoking papers, and policy guiding statements.

The first meeting of the HUGO Ethics Committee took place in Amsterdam in October 1992, chaired by Nancy Wexler (Columbia University). In 2010, under the leadership of then HUGO president Edison Liu (The Jackson Laboratory) and a new chair Ruth Chadwick (Cardiff University), the committee became the HUGO Committee on Ethics, Law and Society (CELS).  Benjamin Capps was nominated to be the present chair at the HUGO Human Genome Meeting, held in Barcelona in 2017.

Chairs 
2017–present: Benjamin Capps (UK, Canada)

2010-2017: Ruth Chadwick (UK)

1996-2008: Bartha Knoppers (Canada)

1992-1996: Nancy Wexler (USA)

Statements 
The Human Genome Organisation (HUGO) and the 2020 COVID-19 pandemic (Human Genomics 15:12), 2021

Statement on Bioinformatics and Capturing the Benefits of Genome Sequencing for Society, 2019

Statement on Supreme Court: Genes are not patentable, June 2013

Statement on Pharmacogenomics (PGx): Solidarity, Equity and Governance, April 2007

Statement on Stem Cells, November 2004

Statement on the scope of gene patents, research exemption, and licensing of patented gene sequences for diagnostics, 2003

Statement on Human Genomic Databases, December 2002

Statement in Gene Therapy Research, April 2001

Statement on Benefit Sharing, April 2000

Statement on Cloning, March 1999

Statement on DNA Sampling: Control and Access, February 1998

Statement on the Principled Conduct of Genetics Research, March 1996

See also
 HUGO Gene Nomenclature Committee
 Victor A. McKusick
 Ira Carmen
 List of genetics research organizations
 International Mammalian Genome Society

References

External links
 HUGO homepage
 HGNC homepage
 CELS homepage

Genomics organizations
International medical and health organizations
International organisations based in Switzerland